Dillwynella haptricola is a species of sea snail, a marine gastropod mollusk in the family Skeneidae.

Description
The height of the shell attains 3.2 mm, its diameter 3.6 mm.

Distribution
This marine species is endemic to New Zealand and is found at depths between 1073 m and 1116 metres.

References

 Marshall, B.A. 1988: Skeneidae, Vitrinellidae and Orbitestellidae (Mollusca: Gastropoda) associated with biogenic substrata from bathyal depths off New Zealand and New South Wales. Journal of Natural History 22: 949-1004

External links
 To World Register of Marine Species

Dillwynella
Gastropods described in 1988
Endemic fauna of New Zealand
Endemic molluscs of New Zealand